Adèr is a surname. Notable people with the surname include:

 Guilhèm Adèr (1567?–1638), Occitan language writer 
 Herman J. Adèr (born 1940), Dutch statistician/methodologist and consultant

See also
 Ader (surname)